The Butler (full title Lee Daniels' The Butler) is a 2013 American historical drama film directed and co-produced by Lee Daniels and with a screenplay by Danny Strong. It is inspired by Wil Haygood's Washington Post article "A Butler Well Served by This Election".

Loosely based on the real life of Eugene Allen, who worked in the White House for decades, the film stars Forest Whitaker as Cecil Gaines, an African-American who is a witness of notable political and social events of the 20th century during his 34-year tenure serving as a White House butler. In addition to Whitaker, the film's all-star cast also features Oprah Winfrey, Mariah Carey, John Cusack, Nelsan Ellis, Jane Fonda, Cuba Gooding Jr., Terrence Howard,  Minka Kelly,  Elijah Kelley, Lenny Kravitz, James Marsden, David Oyelowo, Alex Pettyfer,  Vanessa Redgrave, Alan Rickman, Liev Schreiber, Robin Williams, and Clarence Williams III. It was the last film produced by Laura Ziskin, who died on June 12, 2011, and it was also the final film appearance of Clarence Williams III, who retired from acting in 2018 and died on June 4, 2021.

The film was theatrically released by the Weinstein Company on August 16, 2013, to mostly positive reviews from critics, with many praising the cast but criticizing the historical accuracy, particularly the portrayal of President Reagan. The film grossed over $176 million worldwide against a budget of $30 million.

Plot

In 2009, an elderly Cecil Gaines recounts his life story while waiting at the White House to meet the newly inaugurated president.
Born and raised on a cotton plantation in Macon, Georgia, in 1926 when he was seven, the owner rapes his mother Hattie, his father, Earl confronts him and is killed. Cecil is taken in by the estate's caretaker, who trains him to be an house servant.

In 1937, at 18, Cecil leaves the plantation. Desperately hungry, he breaks into a hotel pastry shop. The elderly master-servant Maynard takes pity on him and gives him a job. Cecil learns advanced serving and interpersonal skills from Maynard, who later recommends Cecil for a position in a Washington, D.C., hotel. While working there, Cecil meets and marries Gloria, and the couple have two sons: Louis and Charlie.

In 1957, Cecil is hired by the White House during Dwight D. Eisenhower's administration. White House maître d'hôtel Freddie Fallows introduces him to head butler Carter Wilson and co-worker James Holloway. Cecil witnesses Eisenhower's reluctance to use troops to enforce school desegregation, then his resolve to uphold the law by racially integrating Little Rock Central High School in Arkansas.

Louis, the elder son, becomes a university student at Fisk University in Nashville, Tennessee, although Cecil feels the South is too volatile. Louis joins the Southern Christian Leadership Conference (SCLC) activist James Lawson's student program, which leads to a nonviolent sit-in at a segregated diner, where he is arrested. Gloria, who feels Cecil puts his job ahead of her, descends into alcoholism.

In 1961, after John F. Kennedy's inauguration, Louis and others are attacked by members of the Ku Klux Klan while on a freedom ride to Birmingham, Alabama. Louis participates in the 1963 Birmingham Children's Crusade, where dogs and water cannons are used to stop the marchers, an action which inspires Kennedy to deliver a national address proposing the Civil Rights Act of 1964. 

After Kennedy is assassinated, his successor, Lyndon B. Johnson, enacts the legislation. As a goodwill gesture, Jackie Kennedy gives Cecil one of the former president's neckties.

Louis participates in the 1965 Selma Voting Rights Movement, which inspires Johnson to demand that Congress enact the landmark Voting Rights Act of 1965. Johnson also gives Cecil a tie bar.

In the late 1960s, after civil rights activist Martin Luther King Jr.'s assassination, Louis tells his family that he has joined the Black Panthers. Cecil orders Louis and his girlfriend to leave his house. Louis is again arrested. Cecil becomes aware of President Richard Nixon's plans to suppress the Black Panthers.

Charlie confides to Louis that he plans to join the war in Vietnam. After enlisting, he is killed and buried at Arlington National Cemetery. When the Black Panthers resort to violence, Louis leaves the organization and returns to college, earning his master's degree in political science and eventually running for a seat in Congress, although Cecil continues to hold resentment against him.

Cecil repeatedly approaches his supervisor at the White House over the unequal pay and career advancement provided to the black White House staff. With President Ronald Reagan's support, Cecil prevails, his reputation growing to the point that he and his wife are invited by the Reagans to be guests at a state dinner. Cecil becomes uncomfortable with the class divisions in the White House. After witnessing Reagan's refusal to support economic sanctions against Apartheid South Africa, he resigns.

Gloria encourages Cecil to mend his relationship with Louis. Realizing his son's actions are heroic, he joins him at a protest against South African apartheid; they are arrested and jailed together.

In 2008, Gloria dies shortly before Barack Obama is elected as the nation's first black president. Two months, two weeks and one day later, Cecil prepares to meet the newly inaugurated President, wearing the articles he received from Kennedy and Johnson. White House Chief Usher Stephen W. Rochon approaches him, telling him the president is ready and preparing to show him the way to the Oval Office. Cecil tells him that he knows the way and walks down the hall to the office.

Cast

 Forest Whitaker as Cecil Gaines, the film's main character, who dedicates his life to becoming a professional domestic worker. 
Michael Rainey Jr. and Aml Ameen portray Cecil at ages 7 and 18.
Gaines' private life
 Oprah Winfrey as Gloria Gaines, Cecil's wife.
 David Oyelowo as Louis Gaines, the Gaines' elder son. 
 Elijah Kelley as Charlie Gaines, the Gaines' younger son.
 Isaac White portrays him at age 10.
 Alex Pettyfer as Thomas Westfall, the brutal plantation owner who kills Earl after raping Hattie.
 David Banner as Earl Gaines, Cecil's father.
 Mariah Carey as Hattie Pearl, Cecil's mother.
 Terrence Howard as Howard, the Gaines' neighbor who romantically pursues Gloria.
 Adriane Lenox as Gina, Howard's wife.
 Yaya DaCosta as Carol Hammie, Louis' girlfriend.
 Vanessa Redgrave as Annabeth Westfall, a matron on the plantation.
 Clarence Williams III as Maynard, an elderly man who mentors a young Cecil and introduces him to his profession.

White House co-workers
 Cuba Gooding Jr. as Carter Wilson, the fast-talking head butler at the White House, with whom Cecil forms a close friendship. 
 Lenny Kravitz as James Holloway, a co-worker butler of Cecil's at the White House.
 Colman Domingo as Freddie Fallows, the White House maitre d' who hires Cecil.

White House historical figures
 Robin Williams as Dwight D. Eisenhower, the 34th President of the United States.
 James DuMont as Sherman Adams, Eisenhower's White House Chief of Staff.
 Robert Aberdeen as Herbert Brownell Jr., Eisenhower's Attorney General.
 James Marsden as John F. Kennedy, the 35th President of the United States.
 Minka Kelly as First Lady Jackie Kennedy
 Liev Schreiber as Lyndon B. Johnson, the 36th President of the United States.
 John Cusack as Richard Nixon, the 37th President of the United States.
 Alex Manette as H. R. Haldeman, Nixon's White House Chief of Staff.
 Colin Walker as John Ehrlichman, Nixon's White House Counsel.
 Alan Rickman as Ronald Reagan, the 40th President of the United States.
 Jane Fonda as First Lady Nancy Reagan
 Stephen Rider as Stephen W. Rochon, Barack Obama's White House Chief Usher.

Civil rights historical figures
 Nelsan Ellis as Martin Luther King Jr.
 Jesse Williams as civil rights activist James Lawson
 Danny Strong, the film's screenwriter, appears as a Freedom Bus journalist.

Presidents Gerald Ford, Jimmy Carter, Barack Obama, and civil rights leader Jesse Jackson are depicted in archival footage.

Melissa Leo and Orlando Eric Street were cast as First Lady Mamie Eisenhower and Barack Obama, respectively, but did not appear in the finished film.

Production

Development
Danny Strong's screenplay is inspired by Wil Haygood's Washington Post article "A Butler Well Served by This Election". The project received initial backing in early 2011, when producers Laura Ziskin and Pam Williams approached Sheila Johnson for help in financing the film. After reading Danny Strong's screenplay, Johnson pitched in her own $2.7 million before bringing in several African-American investors. However, Ziskin died from cancer in June 2011. This left director Daniels and producing partner Hilary Shor to look for further producers on their own. They started with Cassian Elwes, with whom they were working on The Paperboy. Elwes joined the list of producers, and started raising funding for the film. In spring 2012, AI Film, a British financing and production company, added a $6 million guarantee against foreign pre-sales. Finally the film raised its needed $30 million budget through 41 producers and executive producers, including Earl W. Stafford, Harry I. Martin Jr., Brett Johnson, Michael Finley, and Buddy Patrick. Thereafter, as film production started Weinstein Co. picked up U.S. distribution rights for the film. David Glasser, Weinstein Co. COO, called fund raising as an independent film, "a story that's a movie within itself".

The Weinstein Company acquired the distribution rights for the film after Columbia Pictures put the film in turnaround.

The film's title was up for a possible rename due to a Motion Picture Association claim from Warner Bros., which had inherited from the defunct Lubin Company a now-lost 1916 silent short film with the same name. The case was subsequently resolved with the MPAA granting The Weinstein Company permission to add Lee Daniels in front of the title, under the condition that his name was "75% the size of The Butler. On July 23, 2013, the distributor unveiled a revised poster, displaying the title as Lee Daniels' The Butler.

Filming
Principal photography started in June 2012 in New Orleans. Interior White House scenes were shot at Second Line Stages. Production was originally scheduled to wrap in early August 2012 but was delayed by the impact of Hurricane Isaac.

Reception

Box office
In its opening weekend, the film debuted in first place with $24.6 million. The film topped the North American box office in its first three consecutive weeks. The film has grossed $116.6 million in Canada and the United States, it earned $51.1 million elsewhere, for a total of $167.7 million.

Critical response
The Butler received generally positive reviews from critics. On Rotten Tomatoes, it has a 72% rating based on 201 reviews with an average score of 6.60/10. The site's consensus says, "Gut-wrenching and emotionally affecting, Lee Daniels' The Butler overcomes an uneven narrative thanks to strong performances from an all-star cast." On Metacritic, it has a weighted average score of 65 based on 47 reviews, indicating "generally positive reviews". Audiences surveyed by CinemaScore gave the film a grade "A" on scale of A to F.

Todd McCarthy praised the film saying, "Even with all contrivances and obvious point-making and familiar historical signposting, Daniels' The Butler is always engaging, often entertaining and certainly never dull." Richard Roeper lauded the film's casting in particular, remarking that "Forest Whitaker gives the performance of his career". Rolling Stone also spoke highly of Whitaker writing that his "reflective, powerfully understated performance...fills this flawed film with potency and purpose".

Variety wrote that "Daniels develops a strong sense of the inner complexities and contradictions of the civil-rights landscape". USA Today gave the film three out of four stars and noted that "It's inspiring and filled with fine performances, but the insistently swelling musical score and melodramatic moments seem calculated and undercut a powerful story". Miles Davis of the New York Tribune gave the film a negative review, claiming the film to be "Oscar bait", a cliche film designed to attract Oscar nominations.

Kenneth Turan of the Los Angeles Times was more negative: "An ambitious and overdue attempt to create a Hollywood-style epic around the experience of black Americans in general and the civil rights movement in particular, it undercuts itself by hitting its points squarely on the nose with a 9-pound hammer." Several critics compared the film's historical anecdotes and sentimentality to Forrest Gump.

President Barack Obama said, "I teared up thinking about not just the butlers who worked here in the White House, but an entire generation of people who were talented and skilled. But because of Jim Crow and because of discrimination, there was only so far they could go."

Accolades

Historical accuracy
Regarding historical accuracy, Eliana Dockterman wrote in Time: "Allen was born on a Virginia plantation in 1919, not in Georgia.... In the movie, Cecil Gaines grows up on a cotton field in Macon, where his family comes into conflict with the white farmers for whom they work. What befalls his parents on the cotton field was added for dramatic effect.... Though tension between father and son over civil rights issues fuels most of the drama in the film, [Eugene Allen's son] Charles Allen was not the radical political activist that Gaines's son is in the movie."

Particular criticism has been directed at the film's accuracy in portraying President Ronald Reagan. While Alan Rickman's performance generated positive reviews, the director and screenwriters of the film have been criticized for depicting Reagan as indifferent to civil rights and his reluctance to associate with the White House's black employees during his presidency. According to Michael Reagan, the former president's son, "The real story of the White House butler doesn't imply racism at all. It's simply Hollywood liberals wanting to believe something about my father that was never there."

Paul Kengor, one of President Reagan's biographers, also attacked the film, saying, "I've talked to many White House staff, cooks, housekeepers, doctors, and Secret Service over the years. They are universal in their love of Ronald Reagan." In regard to the president's initial opposition to sanctions against apartheid in South Africa, Kengor said, "Ronald Reagan was appalled by apartheid, but also wanted to ensure that if the apartheid regime collapsed in South Africa that it wasn't replaced by a Marxist-totalitarian regime allied with Moscow and Cuba that would take the South African people down the same road as Ethiopia, Mozambique, and, yes, Cuba. In the immediate years before Reagan became president, 11 countries from the Third World, from Asia to Africa to Latin America, went Communist. It was devastating. If the film refuses to deal with this issue with the necessary balance, it shouldn't deal with it at all."

See also

 Backstairs at the White House, a 1979 miniseries with a similar theme
 Civil rights movement in popular culture
 Great Migration
 List of black films of the 2010s

References

External links
 Official website
 
 

2008 United States presidential election in popular culture
2010s political drama films
2010s historical drama films
2013 films
African-American drama films
African-American films
Alliance Films films
American films based on actual events
American historical drama films
American political drama films
Civil rights movement in film
Cultural depictions of Barack Obama
Cultural depictions of Dwight D. Eisenhower
Cultural depictions of Gerald Ford
Cultural depictions of Jacqueline Kennedy Onassis
Cultural depictions of Jimmy Carter
Cultural depictions of John F. Kennedy
Cultural depictions of Lyndon B. Johnson
Cultural depictions of Martin Luther King Jr.
Cultural depictions of Richard Nixon
Cultural depictions of Ronald Reagan
Domestic workers in films
Films about farmers
Films about presidents of the United States
Films about race and ethnicity
Films about racism
Films about rape
Films based on biographies
Films based on newspaper and magazine articles
Films directed by Lee Daniels
Films set in 1926
Films set in 1937
Films set in 1957
Films set in 1960
Films set in 1961
Films set in 1963
Films set in 1964
Films set in 1965
Films set in 1968
Films set in 1969
Films set in 1973
Films set in 1974
Films set in 1986
Films set in 2008
Films set in 2009
Films set in Alabama
Films set in Georgia (U.S. state)
Films set in Oakland, California
Films set in Tennessee
Films set in the White House
Films set in Washington, D.C.
Films shot in New Orleans
Films with screenplays by Danny Strong
United States presidential succession in fiction
2013 drama films
21st-century American women
Apartheid films
Vietnam War films
Films about the Black Panther Party
Films about the Ku Klux Klan
Films about the Kennedy family
Films set in Nashville, Tennessee
Films set on farms
Films set in the 1980s
Films set in the 1970s
Films set in the 1960s
Films set in the 1950s
Films about racism in the United States
The Weinstein Company films
2010s English-language films
2010s American films